Potigny is a commune in the Calvados department in the Normandy region in northwestern France.

Population

International relations
Potigny is twinned with the village of Banwell in Somerset.

See also
Communes of the Calvados department

References

Communes of Calvados (department)
Calvados communes articles needing translation from French Wikipedia